Sparbambus is a monotypic genus of Malaysian jumping spiders containing the single species, Sparbambus gombakensis. It was first described by J. X. Zhang, J. R. W. Woon & D. Q. Li in 2006, and is found only in Malaysia. They are similar to members of Wanlessia. The name is derived from the Indian bambu, referring to the habitat where the species was initially found. The prefix spar denotes that the genus is in the subfamily Spartaeinae. The species name refers to the type locality, the Ulu Gombak Field Studies Centre of the University of Malaya.

The original species were found in bamboo, but repeated searches have failed to find new specimens, leading experts to believe that bamboo isn't their normal habitat. It seems to share the same microhabitat with Paracyrba wanlessi, which preys on aquatic animals, such as Gigantochloa scortechinii, in the hollow interior of decaying bamboo internodes.

References

Arthropods of Malaysia
Monotypic Salticidae genera
Salticidae
Spiders of Asia